Madison Consolidated Schools is a school district headquartered in Madison, Indiana.

Schools
Secondary schools:
 Madison Consolidated High School
 Madison Junior High School

Primary schools:
 Deputy Elementary School
 E. O. Muncie Elementary School
 Lydia Middleton Elementary School
 Rykers' Ridge Elementary School

Preschool:
 Madison Consolidated Preschool

References

External links
 Madison Consolidated Schools
School districts in Indiana